Sir Herbert Nield PC, KC, DL (20 October 1862 – 11 October 1932) was a barrister and Conservative Party politician in the United Kingdom.

Biography
Born in Saddleworth, Yorkshire, Nield was admitted a solicitor in 1885, called to the bar at the Inner Temple in 1895 and 'took silk' as a King's Counsel in 1913.

In 1895 he was elected to Middlesex County Council as a representative of Tottenham. In 1906 he was created a county alderman and remained a member of the council until his death.

Nield was elected as Member of Parliament (MP) for Ealing constituency at the 1906 general election, and held the seat until he retired from the House of Commons at the 1931 general election.

Appointed a deputy lieutenant of Middlesex in 1912, he was knighted in 1918 and later appointed as a Privy Councillor in 1924.

He was Recorder of York.

Nield was twice married. In 1890 he married Mary Catherine Baker of Colyton, Devon. She died in 1893 leaving one son who alter died in the First Battle of the Somme. His second wife was Mabel Owen, second daughter of Sir Francis Cory-Wright, 1st Baronet, with whom he had a second son.

He died on the 11th October 1932 and his body was interred in the Cory-Wright Mausoleum on the western side of Highgate Cemetery.

References

External links 
 

1862 births
1932 deaths
Burials at Highgate Cemetery
Knights Bachelor
Members of the Privy Council of the United Kingdom
Conservative Party (UK) MPs for English constituencies
Deputy Lieutenants of Middlesex
Politicians awarded knighthoods
UK MPs 1906–1910
UK MPs 1910
UK MPs 1910–1918
UK MPs 1918–1922
UK MPs 1922–1923
UK MPs 1923–1924
UK MPs 1924–1929
UK MPs 1929–1931
Members of Middlesex County Council
Members of the Inner Temple
20th-century King's Counsel